

Released films

January–June

July–December

Dubbed films

References

External links
 Straight Telugu films released in year 2000

2000
Telugu
 Telugu films
2000 in Indian cinema